Adam Abu is a Ghanaian politician and member of the New Patriotic Party. He's District Chief Executive of the Mamprugu-Moagduri District in Northern Region of Ghana.

References 

Year of birth missing (living people)
Living people
Place of birth missing (living people)
New Patriotic Party politicians